The 11th Army was an army level command of the German Army in World War I.  It was formed in March 1915 in Kassel originally to serve on the Western Front but was transported to Galicia for service on the Eastern Front.  The army was dissolved on 8 September 1915, but reformed on 23 September 1915 for the Serbian Campaign.  It was finally dissolved on 7 January 1919.

History 
The 11th Army was formed in early 1915. It briefly fought on the Western Front during the Battle of Ypres, holding the line against the Allied attack. On 22 April, it was transferred and placed with the Austrian 4th Army under Mackensen's command, behind the Gorlice–Tarnow gap, south of the Vistula River. In July 1915, the 11th Army advanced into Russian territory in a general German offensive. The 11th Army was dissolved on 8 September 1915.

On 23 September 1915 a new 11th Army was created for the Serbian Campaign under command of Max von Gallwitz. It was composed of the III Corps, the IV Reserve Corps and the X Reserve Corps.
After the retreat of Serbian army, the 11th Army remained on the Salonika front in support of the Bulgarian Army. During its time on the front the army gradually became more and more composed of Bulgarian divisions. By the time of the Vardar Offensive in September 1918, The 11th German Army consisted almost fully of Bulgarian soldiers commanded by German officers.

The headquarters of the Army was situated in Veles on 31 January 1916, moved to Prilep on 5 October 1916 until the retreat to Hungary in September 1918.

Commanders 
11th Army had the following commanders until absorbed by Heeresgruppe Mackensen on 8 September 1915:

The "new" 11th Army had the following commanders:

Glossary 
Armee-Abteilung or Army Detachment in the sense of "something detached from an Army".  It is not under the command of an Army so is in itself a small Army.
Armee-Gruppe or Army Group in the sense of a group within an Army and under its command, generally formed as a temporary measure for a specific task.
Heeresgruppe or Army Group in the sense of a number of armies under a single commander.

See also 

11th Army (Wehrmacht) for the equivalent formation in World War II

References

Bibliography 
 
 
 
 

11
Military units and formations established in 1915
Military units and formations disestablished in 1919